De Scott Evans (March 28, 1847 – July 4, 1898) was an American painter known for working in a number of genres.  Raised in Indiana, he spent much of his career in Ohio and then moved to New York City.  His posthumous reputation is largely based on a number of trompe-l'œil still lifes that have been attributed to him.

Life
David Scott Evans was born in Boston, Indiana to David S. and Nancy A. (Davenport) Evans.  His father was a physician.  He attended Miami University's preparatory school in the 1860s, studying with professor Adrian Beaugureau at Miami and later in Cincinnati. Evans married Alice Josephine Burk in 1872. They had two biological daughters, Mabel and Blanche, and an adopted daughter, Laura.

In 1873, he became head of the art department at Mount Union College in Alliance, Ohio, and taught there until 1875.  Evans then lived in Paris from 1877 to 1878, where he studied with Adolphe William Bouguereau.  He then taught from 1882 to 1887 at the Cleveland Academy of Art, and then moved to New York City in 1887, at the age of forty.

Evans and his three daughters died in July 1898, when the Paris-bound steamer  was rammed by a sailing ship; 500 other passengers and crew were also lost.  His wife was not on board and later remarried.  There is a cenotaph for Evans and his daughters in the Oxford Cemetery in Oxford, Ohio.

Work and legacy
During his life, he was mainly known for his genre paintings and portraits of stylish young women in rich settings.  His popularity faded after his death, until a number of trompe-l'œil still lifes were attributed to him.  Evans is known to have signed his work as D. Scott Evans and later De Scott Evans, and some of the still lifes attributed to him bear the names David Scott, S. S. David, and Stanley S. David.  The attributions are not without question, but are assumed based on the similarity of two paintings of pears, and scholars' inability to identify another artist named "David" who was active at the right time and place.

Gallery

Notes

Other references
 Burnet, Mary Q. (1921). Art and Artists of Indiana. New York: The Century Co.
 Haverstock, Mary Sayer, Jeannette Mahoney Vance, Brian L. Meggitt, Jeffrey Weidman (1999)  Artists in Ohio, 1787-1900: A Biographical Dictionary. Kent State University Press

External links

 Artcyclopedia: De Scott Evans
 

1847 births
1898 deaths
19th-century American painters
American male painters
Artists from Indiana
Artists from Ohio
Burials at Oxford Cemetery, Oxford, Ohio
People from Wayne County, Indiana
Miami University alumni
University of Mount Union faculty
Deaths due to shipwreck at sea
19th-century American male artists
Trompe-l'œil artists